Football Club de Lyon is a French sports club. It was established on 17 November 1893, and is notable for its rugby and football sections.

Honours

Rugby
 French championship:
 Champions: 1909–10

Football
 Coupe de France:
 Runners-up: 1917–18

External links 
 

French rugby union clubs
1893 establishments in France
Sport in Lyon
Football clubs in Lyon